The chattering classes is a politically active, socially concerned and highly educated section of the "metropolitan middle class", especially those with political, media, and academic connections. It is a generally derogatory term, often used by pundits and political commentators.

United Kingdom
It is sometimes used to refer to a liberal elite, but its first use by British journalist Frank Johnson in 1980 appeared to include a wider range of pundits. Indeed, the term is used by people all across the political spectrum to refer to the journalists and political operatives who see themselves as the arbiters of conventional wisdom. As such, the notion of "chattering classes" can be seen as an antonym to the older idea of an unrepresented silent majority, made notable by the U.S. Republican Party President Richard Nixon.

United States
In the United States, the term has come to be used by both the left and right and to describe political opponents, with Stephen Perrault of the Merriam-Webster dictionary suggesting that the term has "connotations of idleness, of useless talk, that the noun 'chatter' does. ... These people don't amount to much — they like to hear themselves talk."

See also 

 Intelligentsia
 Thought leader

References

External links 
BBC wordhunt entry
The Guardian: How the chattering classes turned to talk
The Chattering Classes

Political terminology
Political catchphrases
English phrases
Propaganda in the United States
1980 neologisms
Middle class culture
Class-related slurs